Judit Füle (born 2 October 1941) is a Hungarian gymnast. She competed in six events at the 1960 Summer Olympics.

References

External links
 

1941 births
Living people
Hungarian female artistic gymnasts
Olympic gymnasts of Hungary
Gymnasts at the 1960 Summer Olympics
People from Cegléd
Sportspeople from Pest County